The Movies is a 1925 American comedy film starring Lloyd Hamilton and directed by Roscoe Arbuckle, who was working under the pseudonym "William Goodrich". After a film star breaks his leg, the director replaces the actor with a country boy who resembles him.

Cast
 Lloyd Hamilton as A Country Boy / Comedy Film Star
 Marcella Daly as An Actress
 Arthur Thalasso as The Villain
 Frank Jonasson as The Director
 Glen Cavender as A Traffic Officer
 Florence Lee

Production
Location scenes were filmed at the Montmarte Café on Hollywood Boulevard and the "movie" scenes at the Educational Film studios.

Preservation
A print of The Movies exists and the film been released on DVD as part of a collection of Arbuckle films. Of the three films Arbuckle made with Hamilton, this is the only one that is extant.

See also
 Fatty Arbuckle filmography

References

External links

1925 films
Films directed by Roscoe Arbuckle
1925 comedy films
Educational Pictures short films
1925 short films
American silent short films
American black-and-white films
Silent American comedy films
Films with screenplays by Roscoe Arbuckle
American comedy short films
1920s American films